This is list of national fruits alphabetically arranged by country. Some national fruits are officially designated, some are unofficial.

References 

 
Fruit
Fruits
Fruit